The Hallock–McMillan Building, also known as the Hallock and McMillan Building, is the first and oldest commercial brick building in Portland, Oregon, located downtown at 237 SW Naito Parkway. The building was designed by Absalom Hallock and completed in 1857. It is adjacent to the Fechheimer & White Building. In 1975, it was listed as a "primary landmark" in the National Register of Historic Places (NRHP) nomination of the Portland Skidmore/Old Town Historic District, the building's designation subsequently "translated" to "contributing property" under post-1970s NRHP terminology.

Description and history
Built in 1857, the Hallock–McMillan Building is downtown Portland's first and oldest commercial brick building, according to the Architectural Heritage Center, a preservation advocacy non-profit organization. The building was designed by Absalom Hallock, the "city's first architect", on behalf of the San Francisco Bay Area's Phoenix Iron Works.

In 2010, Portland developer John Russell purchased the building for $700,000. In 2011, Russell announced his plans to restore the building's exterior to its original appearance. Plans include three "graceful" Romanesque-style cast iron arches on the first floor and partial arches above the second floor's windows. Exterior renovation plans must be approved by the Portland Historic Landmarks Commission.

References

External links

 

1857 establishments in Oregon Territory
Buildings and structures in Portland, Oregon
Commercial buildings completed in 1857
Commercial buildings in Oregon
Historic district contributing properties in Oregon
Romanesque Revival architecture in Oregon
Southwest Portland, Oregon
National Register of Historic Places in Portland, Oregon
Commercial buildings on the National Register of Historic Places in Oregon